Jeremiah Hill may refer to:

Jeremiah S. Hill, founder of the Arch Social Club
Jeremiah Hill (basketball) (born 1995), American basketball player